The Metropolitan Collegiate Hockey Conference or MCHC is an ACHA Division 3 league made up of smaller colleges, universities, and community colleges in the Northeast United States. The league was originally formed in 1967-68 as the Metropolitan Intercollegiate Hockey League (MIHL). After a league name change to the BSMIHL (Bi-State Metropolitan Intercollegiate Hockey League) for the 1975-76 season, the league changed its name to its current moniker at the start of the 1976-77 season.

Format
Teams play a 18-game league schedule with the top four teams advancing to the MCHC playoffs at the end of the regular season held during President's Day weekend in February.

Current Teams

Former Teams

Conference Champions
2023 - Sacred Heart University
2022 - Columbia University
2021 - Season Canceled Due to COVID-19
2020 - US Merchant Marine Academy
2019 - Fordham University
2018 - Fordham University
2017 - Ramapo College
2016 - Yale University
2015 - Stevens Institute of Technology
2014 - Fordham University
2013 - State University of New York Maritime College
2012 - County College of Morris
2011 - Wagner College
2010 - Fordham University
2009 - University of Albany
2008 - Farmingdale State College
2007 - University of Albany
2006 - Fordham University
2005 - University of Albany
2004 - Wagner College
2003 - County College of Morris
2002 - Wagner College
2001 - Wagner College
2000 - Stony Brook University
1999 - Wagner College
1998 - Wagner College
1997 - Wagner College
1996 - Marist College
1995 - Rutgers University
1994 - Rutgers University
1993 - Siena College
1992 - Marist College
1991 - Southern Connecticut State University
1990 - Rutgers University
1989 - Rutgers University / County College of Morris
1988 - Rutgers University
1987 - County College of Morris
1986 - Montclair State University
1985 - Manhattan College
1984 - Manhattan College / Southern Connecticut State University / Wagner College
1983 - Wagner College
1982 - Upsala College
1981 - Upsala College
1980 - Queens College
1979 - Queens College
1978 - Upsala College / Wagner College
1977 - Fairleigh Dickinson University / Iona College
1976 - Ramapo College / Rockland Community College
1975 - Fairfield University / Ramapo College
1974 - Fairfield University
1973 - Fairfield University
1972 - Nassau Community College
1971 - St. Francis College
1970 - St. Francis College
1969 - St. Francis College
1968 - Iona College

External links
 MCHC Web site
 MCHC LinkedIn page
 MCHC Google Calendar
 MCHC Twitter
 MCHC YouTube Channel

See also
American Collegiate Hockey Association 
List of ice hockey leagues

ACHA Division 3 conferences